Bulgaria competed at the 1924 Summer Olympics in Paris, France, with 24 athletes competing in 4 sports. It was the first official appearance of the nation at the modern Olympic Games, although some sources claim that Charles Champaud represented Bulgaria in the inaugural 1896 Summer Olympics.

Athletics

Four athletes represented Bulgaria in 1924. It was the nation's debut appearance in the sport.

Ranks given are within the heat.

Cycling

Seven cyclists represented Bulgaria in 1924. It was the nation's debut in the sport as well as the Games.

Road cycling

Ranks given are within the heat.

Track cycling

Ranks given are within the heat.

Equestrian

Two equestrians represented Bulgaria in 1924. It was the nation's debut in the sport as well as the Games.

Football

Bulgaria competed in the Olympic football tournament for the first time in 1924.

 Round 1 Bye

 Round 2

Final rank 9th place

References

External links
Bulgarian Olympic Committee
Official Olympic Reports

Nations at the 1924 Summer Olympics
1924
Olympics